Patrick Smyth (21 October 1893 – 29 May 1954) was a New Zealand  teacher, principal and educationalist. Of Māori descent, he identified with the Nga Puhi iwi. He was born in Pungaere, Northland, New Zealand in 1893.

References

1893 births
1954 deaths
New Zealand schoolteachers
New Zealand Māori schoolteachers
Ngāpuhi people